MV Queen of Cowichan is a BC Ferries vessel, built in Victoria, British Columbia in 1976. The ship, like all C-class ferries, is double-ended. This means the ship never has to turn around in port during regular service. Almost identical to Queen of Coquitlam, the vessel has a car capacity of 312 and a passenger capacity for 1,494 people. The ship has two car decks. A lower car deck capable of carrying trucks and buses carries the overheight vehicles while the upper car deck can carry the majority of the cars on board. She is named for the regional district of Cowichan Valley Regional District.

External links
BC Ferries: Queen of Cowichan
West Coast Ferries: Queen of Cowichan
The Canadian Transportation Safety Board's report on accident aboard in 1995

C-class ferries
1976 ships
Ships built in British Columbia